Jan Opaliński may refer to several members of the Opaliński family:
 Jan Opaliński (1519–1561) (or 1529?), father of Jan Opaliński (1546–1598)
 Jan Opaliński (1546–1598) (1546–c. 1590), castellan of Rogozno, father of Jan Opaliński (1581–1637)
 Jan Opaliński (1581–1637), voivode of Poznań

 Jan Karol Opaliński, (1642–1695), castellan of Poznań, starost